This is an evolving list of Danish nurses.

B
Ellen Johanne Broe (1900–1994), nurse and nursing educator

C
Louise Conring (1824–1891), first trained nurse in Denmark, head of Copenhagen's Deaconess Institute
Connie Kruckow (born 1953), nurse and union leader, headed the Danish Nurses' Organization from 2000 to 2009

F
Ilia Fibiger (1817–1867), writer, nurse, Denmark's first professional nurse
Thora Fiedler (1854-1941), nurse, prosthetist, inventor, nursing home principal

H
Bodil Hellfach (1856–1941), nurse, deputy head of the Danish Nurses' Organization

J
Victoria Jensen (1847–1930), deaconess, nursing supervisor, from 1914 head of Copenhagen's Deaconess Institute

M
Charlotte Munck (1876–1932), nurse, trade unionist, important figure in the training of nurses

N
 Charlotte Norrie (1855–1940), nursing campaigner and women's rights activist

R
 Christiane Reimann (1888–1979), first Danish nursing graduate, secretary of the International Council of Nurses

S
Merry Elisabeth Scheel (1929–2007), nursing theorist, writer
Kirsten Stallknecht (1937–2021), nurse, president of the International Council of Nurses
Henny Tscherning (1853–1932), nurse and trade unionist, headed the Danish Nurses Organization from 1899 to 1927

Z
Sophie Zahrtmann (1841–1925), deaconess, nurse, head of Copenhagen's Deaconess Institute

Danish nurses
Danish nurses
Nurses
nurses